Shea Butter Baby is the debut studio album by American singer and songwriter Ari Lennox. It was released on May 7, 2019, by Dreamville and Interscope Records. The album was executive produced by Dreamville producer Elite. In addition, the majority of the album was produced by Dreamville's in-house producers: J. Cole, Elite, Omen, Ron Gilmore, and Christo, among others.

Background
Ari Lennox was signed to Dreamville Records in 2015 after her music had been circulating throughout the label. Eventually, they flew her to their studio to work on references for Rihanna, but the songs wound up going to Lennox because she was "not really a songwriter for other artists," and wrote personal records for herself.

Release and promotion
On July 16, 2018, Ari Lennox released the lead single, "Whipped Cream", for her debut album, with an accompanied music video on September 5. During November 2018, Ari released four promotional singles: "40 Shades of Choke", "Grampa", "No One" and "Pedigree".

The title track being the second single "Shea Butter Baby" with J. Cole, was released on February 26, 2019, which first appeared on the Creed II soundtrack on November 16, 2018. The song was accompanied by a music video on February 20, 2019 and surpassed three million views via YouTube within the first week. On April 30, Ari Lennox announced the release date and tracklist of the album, and released the fifth promotional single "Up Late", and the music video for the song was released on May 14. On August 5, a live performance of the song "I Been" at A Colors Show was released. On August 6, she released the music video for "BMO", directed by Child.

Tours
On March 27, 2019, she announced her first headlining tour, with the first leg beginning on May 12 and ending on June 14 in her hometown Washington, D.C., with supporting acts Baby Rose, Mikhala Jené, and Ron Gilmore. The second leg of the tour is in Europe beginning in December.

Remix EP
On March 27, 2020, Shea Butter Baby (Remix EP) was released, featuring guest appearances from Doja Cat, Smino, and Durand Bernarr. It included remixes for the songs "BMO", "I Been" and "Facetime".

Writing and recording
Ari Lennox spoke with Complex about the writing process of the album saying, it "is just whatever is happening in my life right then and there. Sometimes it's just very blunt." She told XXL about the experiences she expressed on the album saying "I'm singing about my first apartment, about liking broke niggas—if your soul is beautiful then who cares? I have this joint called "Static" [where] I talk about my anxiety in a metaphorical way. Just a lot of sex, soul, romance and hip-hop."

She began working on her debut album promptly after getting signed to Dreamville, and took four years to complete. Ron Gilmore spoke on the recording process and how the album evolved to its final form in an interview with Revolt, saying:

Omen produced "BMO" which samples Galt MacDermot's "Space". Ari's manager, Justin LaMotte asked Omen to send the file so they could work on it, but his computer was damaged and the files were lost. After remaking the beat, he got in with Ron Gilmore and added some music, with Elite helping them tweak some of the sounds. Christo created the beat for "Broke", with additional producers adding "some sparkles or arrangements here and there." JID sent in his verse for the song at the last minute before turning in the album. At the end of "Speak to Me", Elite and Gilmore had Carlin White play some live drums into a "Latin groove" at the end.

Elite also talked about "Static" being his favorite song on the album saying "when I first heard it played back, I got emotional. I felt goosebumps, and it was tugging at my emotions -- so when that happens with the song, I always think it's special, because I know if I feel that way, somebody else out there is going to feel that way." Ari claims that "New Apartment" is the most important song on the album saying "it’s different, it’s so unique and it comes from my soul. It’s super important for people to move out when they can and experience their own world and their own space. It’s important to celebrate that." Anytime the song was questioned about not making the album, Ari would vehemently disagree. The skits on the album derived from audio recordings from Ari's Instagram Live, which was Cole's idea to keep an archive of the footage.

Critical reception

At Metacritic, which assigns a normalized rating out of 100 to reviews from mainstream publications, the album received an average score of 81, indicating "universal acclaim".

Writing for Pitchfork, Ann-Derrick Gaillot said, "The debut album from the neo-soul singer-songwriter is driven by warm funk and soul and has the healing familiarity of hanging out on the couch commiserating with a best friend." The writer asserted that the album "grounds the spiritual sultriness of neo-soul and R&B in irreverent frankness, subverting the idea that the modern self-assured woman must maintain a divine facade. There's power, she suggests, in celebrating the imperfect and slightly messy, rather than chunks of reality polished smooth." Writing for Exclaim!, A. Harmony said the album "is a charming coming-of-age tale that is endearing in its relatable simplicity."

Cherise Johnson of HipHopDX said the album "essentially satisfies a thirst for the kind of rhythm and blues that feels good to spirit, much like a home-cooked meal after returning home from college for the first time. It's a coming-of-age project, filled with honest words backed with real instrumentation and speaks for a generation of Black women who just want to be themselves — and clearly, no one, not Ari anyway, is waiting for permission." Tyrell Nicolas of Clash gave a positive review of the album, saying it "manages to meld contemporary R&B with other sounds like soul, funk, and blues, all while introducing us to the Ari Lennox of today – and the inspirations that guide her every move." The writer continued to say "Perhaps the most endearing aspect of 'Shea Butter Baby' is an authentic innocence that threads through it – the subtle interludes that feature in the space between songs lay bare Ari Lennox's passions, fears, desires, and intentions." Amira Rasool of Paper wrote about the topics of the album saying "To the average listener, the themes of love and love lost between two lovers may standout most on the album, but for Lennox, the empowerment of Black women and their place in the world is what she hopes will shine through."

Accolades

Commercial performance
With only three days of tracking, the album debuted at number 104 on the US Billboard 200 chart, and moved up to number 67 the following week. It also peaked at number 38 on the US Top R&B/Hip-Hop Albums chart, and number 7 on the US R&B chart.

Track listing 
Credits adapted from Tidal.

Notes

  signifies an additional producer.
Sample credits

 "Chicago Boy" samples "Gengis" by Chico Hamilton.
 "BMO" samples "Space" by Galt MacDermot.
 "Broke" samples "Lullaby" by Chargaux feat. Soft Glas. 
 "New Apartment" samples "Land of Passion" by Hubert Laws.
 "Whipped Cream" samples "Two of Us" by Cameo.
 "Static" samples "Look Into The Sky" by RAMP.

Personnel
Technical
 Juro "Mez" Davis – mixing (all tracks)

Charts

Certifications

References

Dreamville Records albums
Albums produced by J. Cole
2019 debut albums